The Wacken Carnage is a CD/DVD set of death metal band Bloodbath at a very rare live appearance recorded on 5 August 2005 at the Wacken Open Air Festival in Germany. At that time, this live appearance was presented as the only Bloodbath show there would ever be, but Bloodbath has since headlined Party.San Metal Open Air in Germany on 8 August 2008, Pellavarock in Finland on 9 August 2008, and Hellfest in France on 22 June 2010 and Bloodstock Open Air in England on 15 August 2010, as well as toured North America and Europe in 2018 and 2019.

Track listing

Personnel
Mikael Åkerfeldt – vocals
Anders "Blakkheim" Nyström – guitar, backing vocals
Jonas Renkse – bass
Dan Swanö – guitar, backing vocals
Martin "Axe" Axenrot – drums

References

Bloodbath albums
2008 live albums
Peaceville Records albums
Live death metal albums
Albums with cover art by Travis Smith (artist)